Josiah Marvel Jr. (November 26, 1904, Wilmington, Delaware - December 29, 1955, Wilmington, Delaware) was an American diplomat who served as chief of the United States' diplomatic mission in Denmark from 1946 to 1949, originally at the rank of Envoy Extraordinary and later as Ambassador Extraordinary and Minister Plenipotentiary. He was appointed by President Harry S. Truman.  He also was a lawyer, politician, and soldier.

Marvel graduated from Harvard Law School.

Marvel served as Delaware Secretary of State from 1938 to 1941. He ran for Governor of Delaware in 1940 as a Democrat, losing the election to Republican Walter W. Bacon. During World War II he served with the United States Army Air Force.

References

External links

20th-century American diplomats
People from Wilmington, Delaware
Ambassadors of the United States to Denmark
Harvard Law School alumni
Delaware Democrats
Secretaries of State of Delaware
1904 births
1955 deaths